Mulbring is a village in the Hunter Region of New South Wales, Australia. At the 2016 census, Mulbring recorded a population of 597.

The village is situated about 10 kilometres south of Kurri Kurri and about 1 km north of the village of Mount Vincent. The nearest major town is Cessnock  which is approximately 25 km north-west of Mulbring.  Mulbring is in the City of Cessnock local government area (LGA) and Northumberland County at an elevation of 47 metres above sea level.

Mulbring was originally a stopping place for travellers going to and from Sydney to the Maitland and Newcastle area in the late 19th century.

Mulbring was serviced by a Post Office until 2017. The public school has 42 pupils enrolled as of 2018.

See also 
 Mount Sugarloaf (New South Wales)

References

External links
 Mulbring Uniting Church Cemetery records

Localities in New South Wales